Last Exile is an animated television series created by Gonzo in celebration of the company's 10th anniversary. The dieselpunk fantasy series was directed by Koichi Chigira, and character designs were created by Range Murata. The story is set on a fictional world divided in eternal conflict between the nations of Anatoray and Disith, and sky couriers Claus Valca and Lavie Head must deliver a girl named Alvis E. Hamilton, who holds the key to uniting the two factions.

Last Exile aired in Japan on TV Tokyo from April 8 to September 30, 2003. The series was previously licensed for English-language broadcast and distribution in North America by Geneon Entertainment (then Pioneer Entertainment) in June 2003. Currently, the series North America license is now owned by Funimation Entertainment. Geneon premiered its dubbed version of the series in TechTV's Anime Unleashed programming block on March 8, 2004. The first 13 episodes aired nightly until March 14, 2004. The remaining 13 episodes premiered on December 6, 2004, with new episodes airing each weeknight until the series concluded on December 22, 2004. ADV Films previously owned the license for the series' English release in the United Kingdom before the company's demise and is now licensed by Manga Entertainment as of January 2013, and distribution rights in Australia and New Zealand are owned by Madman Entertainment. Last Exile was licensed for regional language release in France, Germany, and Sweden. On December 26, 2008, American production house Funimation Entertainment announced it was taking over production and distribution of the show from Geneon. Last Exile has also been hosted at the streaming media website Crunchyroll.

Two pieces of theme music were used for the series. "Cloud Age Symphony", performed by Shuntaro Okino, was used as the opening theme for all 26 episodes, and Hitomi Kuroishi's "Over The Sky" was used as the ending theme.

A sequel, Last Exile: Fam, The Silver Wing, began a simulcast broadcast in both Japan and Asia on the same day on October 15, 2011 by TV Tokyo and Animax Asia respectively with the Animax airing broadcast with English subtitles and other local languages subtitles in each market area of Asia. Taking place two years after the events of Last Exile, the new series is set on Earth where there is a civil war with the powerful Ades Federation conquering the other nations. The titular protagonist Fam Fan Fan and her friend Giselle Collette are Sky Pirates who get involved in the civil war when they rescue Millia il Velch Cutrettola Turan, the younger princess of the Kingdom of Turan. Fam and Giselle must help Millia restore the kingdom after its eventual demise and bring back the days of the Grand Race, an international grand prix which celebrates world peace.

Two theme songs were used for Last Exile: Fam, The Silver Wing. The opening theme song is "Buddy" by Maaya Sakamoto while the ending theme song is "Starboard" by Hitomi Kuroishi. Four special ending theme songs were used in certain episodes; "Starboard [Silky Wind ver.]", sung by Hitomi Kuroishi in another language, was used in episodes 8 and 20, "Innocent Eyes" was used in episode 17, "Sorrows of Life" was used in episode 18 and "Grand Exile" was used in episode 19. The original opening and ending theme songs from Last Exile, "Cloud Age Symphony" by Shuntaro Okino and "Over The Sky" by Hitomi Kuroishi respectively, was used in episode 15.5.

Episode list
The episode titles were originally given in English, as displayed at the beginning of each episode, and use terms from chess.

Last Exile (2003)

Last Exile: Fam, the Silver Wing (2011)
A special episode featuring an extended preview of the main series was aired on October 8, 2011, one week prior to the sequel anime's airing. It was broken into four parts: File: 001 -New Story-, File: 002 -Characters-, File: 003 -Production Staff-, and a special message from each of the three main characters to the viewers. The special ends with a TV size preview of the opening theme "Buddy" sung by Maaya Sakamoto.

Volume DVDs

Japanese releases
Japanese distributor Victor Entertainment released a total of 13 DVD compilations of Last Exile between July 23, 2003, and July 21, 2004. Limited version releases were also available for the first and eighth volumes that included an art poster and an action figure each. A complete seven-disc boxed set was released on November 21, 2004. The deluxe edition of this set included a model of Tatiana's and Alister's red vanship, a short fiction on the Battle of Otranto, unpublished articles on the series, and illustrations by character designer Range Murata. A reprint of the 2004 DVD boxed set is released by Victor Entertainment along with a remastered Blu-ray boxed set. Both boxes are recreated especially for the updated release, which also comes with a reprint of the artbook "Last Exile Chronicle" originally in a 2007 limited edition release.

North American releases
Last Exile received a respectable amount of attention in the United States. Pioneer Entertainment (later Geneon Entertainment) licensed the series in June 2003, two months after the first episode aired in Japan, and released the first compilation DVD volume on November 18, 2003. After Geneon ceased distribution of its licensed titles in 2007, the series was licensed to Funimation Entertainment, and a four-disc boxed set was released on May 5, 2009.

Other releases
Madman Entertainment, Last Exile's licensor and distributor in Australia and New Zealand, released a seven-disc compilation set on February 15, 2006. The series was also previously licensed by ADV Films for distribution in the United Kingdom before the company's demise. Manga Entertainment currently has the license for UK distribution

Notes

References
General
 

Specific

External links
 Last Exile at JVC Music official website 
 Last Exile at Funimation Entertainment official website
 Last Exile at Madman Entertainment official website

Episodes
Lists of anime episodes
Lists of Japanese television series episodes